Aldo Bello (Aldo Jonathan Bello Morillo) (born 23 May 1975 in Maracaibo, Zulia) is a male hammer thrower from Venezuela. His personal best throw is 67.63 metres, achieved in August 2005 in Armenia.

Biography
He won the silver medal at the 2001 Central American and Caribbean Championships, the bronze medal at the 2002 Central American and Caribbean Games, the gold medal at the 2003 Central American and Caribbean Championships, the bronze medal at the 2003 South American Championships and the bronze medal at the 2006 Central American and Caribbean Games. He also became Cuban champion in 2006.

Personal bests
Hammer throw: 68.34 m –  Brežice, 27 August 2011

Achievements

References

External links

Picture of Aldo Bello

1975 births
Living people
Athletes (track and field) at the 2011 Pan American Games
Venezuelan male hammer throwers
Central American and Caribbean Games gold medalists for Venezuela
Competitors at the 1998 Central American and Caribbean Games
Competitors at the 2002 Central American and Caribbean Games
Competitors at the 2006 Central American and Caribbean Games
Competitors at the 2010 Central American and Caribbean Games
Central American and Caribbean Games medalists in athletics
Pan American Games competitors for Venezuela
Sportspeople from Maracaibo